Dual-role transvestism is the formal diagnosis used by psychologists and physicians to describe people who wear clothes of the opposite sex to experience being the opposite sex temporarily, but don't have a sexual motive or want gender reassignment surgery. The International Classification of Diseases (ICD-10) list three diagnostic criteria for "Dual-role transvestism" (F64.1).

A person who is diagnosed with dual-role transvestism should not receive a diagnosis of transvestic fetishism (F65.1).

Dual-role transvestism has been recommended for elimination from the International Statistical Classification of Diseases and Related Health Problems, 11th Revision (ICD-11), due to its lack of clinical relevance. The ICD-11 for Mortality and Morbidity Statistics (Version: 04/2019) no longer categorises dual-role transvestism as a "mental disorder". The changes to the diagnostic manual will come into effect on 1 January 2022.

See also
 Bigender
 Transvestism

References

External links 

Cross-dressing
Types of mental disorders
Gender identity